The National Network Management Centre is the main national network operations centre of BT Group, situated in Shropshire.

History
BT moved to the countryside site in the 1980s. The NMC is also known as the Customer Experience and Management Centre, the International Network Management Centre (INMC), or the National Control Centre (NCC). The BT Global Media Network delivers television content around the world. BT Retail split into BT Consumer and BT Business.

The transformation of BT's network to becoming digital began in 1985, and finished in July 1990. BT's Worldwide Network Management Centre at Oswestry opened on 5 September 1990, at a cost of £4m.

The site appeared on the BBC Two documentary Genius of Invention.

Structure
It is situated on the A495, within a few hundred yards of the road's western terminus at the roundabout with the A5, in the west of the parish of Whittington.

The site has a staff of around 440. Jamie Ford, the former chief executive of Plusnet, runs BT IT Services.

Originally two buildings - A and B.  Building C was built to link these together and forms the hexagonal reception building.  Building D was built to be the new Network Management Centre, which has now been superseded by the New Wave Building.

Display screen
The site has a large display screen, built by Synelec (bought by Planar Systems), made from 140 composite screens. The screen is ten feet high, and seventy feet wide.

Function
The site is the home of the UK's speaking clock. BT IT Services, headquartered at Barlborough in Derbyshire on the A616, have a main operation in the building.

It monitors network traffic on BT's network across the UK, including 0800, 0845 and 999 numbers. It monitors televotes provide by RIDE (Recorded Information Distribution Equipment). RIDE is accessed via the SOAP protocol.

At peak periods it implements call gapping load control. BT Wholesale controls its traffic from the site.

Every two minutes the site contacts around 700 of BT's telephone exchanges to find out how busy they are. 80% of BT's network consists of optical fibre.

See also
 Institute of Telecommunications Professionals
 Telecommunications in the United Kingdom
 :Category:Network performance
 Erlang distribution
 Yarnfield Park in Yarnfield in Staffordshire west of the M6 Stafford services, the former main BT training centre, which now has a training site for telegraph poles and fibre

References

External links
 BT IT Services
 Independent October 2011

British Telecom buildings and structures
Buildings and structures in Shropshire
History of Shropshire
Network management
Organisations based in Shropshire
Science and technology in Shropshire
Teletraffic
1980s establishments in the United Kingdom